James Shoolbred and Company was a draper and later a department store, located on Tottenham Court Road, London.

James Shoolbred and Co. (aka Jas Shoolbred) were established in the 1820s at 155 Tottenham Court Road. It was originally a drapers supplying the furniture trade. In the late 1860s/early 1870s the company began designing, manufacturing and selling high quality furniture, of their own design. Their sophisticated designs referenced Regency aesthetics which were informed by antiquity  - Greek/Roman styles.

The company's sales catalogue features guides to Victorian home owners about how to put room sets together to achieve a desirable aesthetic, 'a guide to good taste'. 
In the 1880s, Shoolbred had opened the city's first large department store on Tottenham Court Road, London.
In the mid 1880s Schoolbred was granted a Royal Warrant, testament to the quality of their furniture.

The company ceased trading in 1931.

References

Shoolbred James
Defunct retail companies of the United Kingdom
Demolished buildings and structures in London
Shops in London
Tottenham Court Road